The North Riding County Football Association, also known as the North Riding FA, is the football governing body for the North Riding of Yorkshire.

Affiliated members pay a fee commensurate with the level of competition they play in. Affiliated members benefit from access to support and guidance on such areas as health and safety and access to finance or grants. The County FA is directly responsible for the governance of County Cup competitions.

Membership

Clubs located within the geographical area of the old North Riding of Yorkshire boundaries are eligible for affiliation to the Association, including those participating at the higher levels of the Football League System in England. Clubs who enter teams into Saturday and Sunday competitions are required to have a separate affiliation for each. The Association consists of two District Associations and six Saturday and Sunday leagues covering the old North Riding of Yorkshire, as well as eight Junior leagues and three Women & Girls leagues.

Governing council membership of the County FA is allocated between five geographic divisions, proportion of councillors in each is determined by the relative size of each division. The divisions are Whitby to Redcar with 3 members; Grangetown to Thornaby with 4 members; Northallerton and Dales with 2 members; Scarborough & District Association with 1 member and the York & District Association with 2 members.

Affiliated leagues

Saturday leagues

The Saturday leagues are listed below with the relevant level in the English football league system shown in brackets where applicable. Each of the leagues run their own cup competitions.

Northern League - Division 1 (L9), Division 2 (L10)
North Riding Football League - Premier (L11), Division 1 (L12)
York Football League - Premier Division (L14), Division 1 (L15), Division 2 (L16), Division 3 (L17), Division 4 (L18), Reserve A, Reserve B, Reserve C.
Beckett Football League - Division 1, Division 2
Scarborough & District League - Division 1, Division 2, Division 3
Wensleydale Creamery Football League - Division 1
North East Christian Fellowship League

Sunday leagues

Langbaurgh Sunday League - 3 Divisions
Redcar Sunday League - 2 Divisions
York Sunday Morning League - 4 Divisions
Scarborough and District Sunday League - 3 Divisions
Teesborough Football League - 2 Divisions
Black Sheep Brewery Hambleton Football Combination - 3 Divisions
Claro Sunday League
Stockton Sunday League

Youth leagues

York & District Youth Football League 
Teesside Junior Football Alliance 
Wensleydale Junior Football League 
Cleveland Youth Football League 
Scarborough & District Minor League
Harrogate & District Junior League
YMSV York Minor League
Hambleton & Richmondshire Junior Football League

Women's and girls' leagues

North Riding Women's Football League 
Tees Valley Girls League 
City of York Girls Football League
Harrogate & District Junior Girls League
North Riding & Tees Valley Girls League

Other leagues
Play Football York - for 5, 6 & 7-a-side teams

County FA competitions

All affiliated clubs of the County FA are required by Rule 18 of the Membership Rules to enter at least one of the County FA Cup competitions. There is a financial penalty if an exemption is applied for by any affiliated member.

North Riding Senior Cup

Any team that has entered a Football Association competition such as the Challenge Cup, F.A. Trophy or F.A. Vase must enter the Senior Cup. The Senior Cup was first competed for in 1881 as the Cleveland Cup mostly by clubs from the Middlesbrough area. The first winners were Middlesbrough, who were also the first winners of the competition in 1902 when it was renamed to the current one. Middlesbrough have won the competition fifty four times, which is the most by any team, their last success being in 2017–18. The current holders are Marske United, who won the 2020 final 6–0 against Thornaby.

Other Cup competitions

Adult

North Riding Saturday Cup - current holders are Boro Rangers who won the 2021 competition by defeating Yarm & Eaglescliffe 3–1 in regulation play .
North Riding Sunday Cup - current holders are Middlesbrough Dormans who won the 2021 competition by defeating Bishopthorpe CFC.
North Riding Saturday Challenge Cup - current holders are New Marske who defeated Boro Rangers Reserves 1–0.
North Riding Sunday Challenge Cup - current holders are Angel Athletic who won the 2021 competition by defeating Trafalgar 4–1.
North Riding Ladies Cup - current holders are Middlesbrough who won the 2021 competition by defeating York City 1–0.

Junior Cup competitions

Junior Cup - U11 - current holders are Boro Rangers. who won the 2015 final defeating Grangetown Boys Club 3–1. There has been no competition since this one.
Junior Cup - U12 - current holders are York City U12 who won the 2021 Final defeating Boro Rangers U21 1–0.
Junior Cup - U13 - current holders are York City U13 who won the 2021 competition by defeating Boro Rangers U13 4–3 on penalties after a 2–2 draw in regulation play.
Junior Cup - U14 - current holders are Boro Rangers who won the 2021 final defeating Marton Juniors U14 1–0.
Junior Cup - U15 - current holders are Marton Juniors U15 who won the 2021 competition by defeating Whinney Banks YCC Juniors U15 6–0.
Junior Cup - U16 - current holders are Boro Rangers U16 who won the 2021 Final defeating Guisborough Town Juniors U16 4–0.
Junior Cup - U19 - current holders are Scarborough Athletic U19 who won the 2021 competition by defeating Brooklyn FC U19 4–2.
Junior Girls Cup - U12 - current holders are Boro Rangers Girls U12 who won the 2021 competition by defeating Scarborough Ladies U12 5–1.
Junior Girls Cup - U14 - current holders are Grangetown Boys Club U12 Girls who won the 2021 competition by defeating York Railway Institute Girls U14 5–2.
Junior Girls Cup - U16 - current holders are Boro Rangers U16 Girls who won the 2021 competition by defeating Guisborough Town Juniors U15 Girls 5–0.

References

External links

County football associations
Football in North Yorkshire
North Riding of Yorkshire
Stokesley